Songdin may refer to:

Songdin, Boudry, Burkina Faso
Songdin, Zorgho, Burkina Faso